Sky Dragon (also titled Murder in the Air) is a 1949 American mystery film, the sixth in which Roland Winters portrayed Charlie Chan. Directed by Lesley Selander, it is the last Chan film in the long-running series that originated in 1930 with Fox Film Corporation production of Charlie Chan Carries On, starring Warner Oland.

Synopsis
After passengers on an airplane headed for San Francisco are drugged, they wake up to discover that a quarter-million dollars is missing. Mantan Moreland provides comic relief as Chan's chauffeur, Birmingham Brown.

Cast
Roland Winters as Charlie Chan
Mantan Moreland as Birmingham Brown
Keye Luke as Lee Chan
Milburn Stone as pilot Capt. Tim Norton
Joel Marston as copilot Don Blake
Lyle Talbot as Andrew Barrett, passenger on DC-3
Iris Adrian as Wanda LaFern, burlesque dancer and passenger on DC-3
Elena Verdugo as Wanda's sister Connie LaFern and former wife of Andrew Barrett, stewardess using alias Marie Burke
Paul Maxey as John Anderson, investigator for the insurance company
John Eldredge as William French, owner of the insurance company
Tim Ryan as Lt. Mike Ruark
Noel Neill as Jane Marshall
Lyle Latell as Ed Davidson

External links

1949 films
American black-and-white films
Charlie Chan films
Monogram Pictures films
Films directed by Lesley Selander
American aviation films
1949 mystery films
American mystery films
1940s English-language films
1940s American films